is a Japanese term for any weekly magazine, including politically provocative weekly tabloid newspapers.

As noted by Watanabe and Gamble in the Japan Media Review and in their book A Public Betrayed, the genre is "often described as bizarre blends of various types of U.S. magazines, such as Newsweek, The New Yorker, People, Penthouse, and The National Enquirer.

Shūkanshi have been a source of anti-semitic articles in Japan, including Shukan Bunshun, Marco Polo, and Shukan Shincho, which have repeatedly published articles denying the Holocaust.  Shukan Shincho was found guilty of libel in Tokyo court for publishing an unsubstantiated allegation of murder by a Soka Gakkai member, and has been criticized for sensationalistic stories regarding a disputed Paleolithic settlement site in Japan. The magazine has also been rebuked for publishing the names and photographs of minors who have been accused of criminal acts, even before their trials began.

See also
 Shūkan Bunshun
 Shūkan Gendai
 Shukan Shincho
 Weekly Asahi Geinō
 Weekly Playboy

References

External links 
 Shukan Shincho 
 Review for A Public Betrayed in Japan Media Review

Antisemitism in Japan
Holocaust denial
Political mass media in Japan
Right-wing antisemitism